The history of Azad Kashmir, a part of the Kashmir region administered by Pakistan, is related to the history of the Kashmir region during the Dogra rule. Azad Kashmir borders the Pakistani provinces of Punjab and Khyber Pakhtunkhwa to the south and west respectively, Gilgit–Baltistan to the north, and the Indian union territory of Jammu and Kashmir to the east.

Modern history 

The princely state of Jammu and Kashmir came into being in 1846 after the First Anglo-Sikh War. Prior to that, Jammu was a tributary of the Sikh empire based in Lahore.  Gulab Singh, formerly a footman in the Maharaja Ranjit Singh's army who distinguished himself in various campaigns, was appointed as the Raja of Jammu in 1822. The Valley of Kashmir was also a part of the Sikh empire, ruled through a separate governor. Raja Gulab Singh successively fought and captured Rajouri (1821), Kishtwar (1821), and through his general Zorawar Singh, Suru valley and Kargil (1835), Ladakh (1834–1840), and Baltistan (1840). He became a wealthy and influential noble in the Sikh court.

During the First Anglo-Sikh war in 1845–1846, Gulab Singh sided with the British, leading to a Sikh defeat. In the ensuing Treaty of Lahore, the Sikhs were made to cede Kashmir and Hazara to the British, in lieu of their indemnity, and to recognize Gulab Singh as an independent Mahraja. A week later, in the Treaty of Amritsar, Gulab Singh paid the British the indemnity that was due from the Sikhs, and acquired Kashmir in return. Thus Gulab Singh became the Maharaja of the state of Jammu and Kashmir, founding a new Dogra Dynasty. The Treaty of Amritsar continues to be widely regarded by the Kashmiris as a "sale deed".

In 1856, Gulab Singh abdicated in favour of his son Ranbir Singh, who became the Maharaja. During the Indian Mutiny of 1857, Ranbir Singh again came to the aid of the British and was duly rewarded. During Ranbir Singh's rule, Kashmir faced oppressive despotism, as recognized by British observers. In 1860, Ranbir Singh annexed Gilgit. Hunza and Nagar became tributaries soon afterwards. Ranbir Singh was succeeded by Pratap Singh (1885–1925) and Hari Singh (1925–1952), the latter being the ruler at the time of Indian independence.

The state of Jammu and Kashmir in 1947 was extremely diverse. The Valley of Kashmir, the most populous region, was a historically powerful kingdom, having stood up to the Arabs and the Afghan-Turk invaders, and remaining independent until the time of Akbar. It was 97% Muslim, with 3% religious minorities, mostly the Hindu community of Kashmiri Pandits. The Jammu division's eastern districts had a Hindu majority population culturally aligned to the Hill states of Himachal Pradesh. Its western districts like Poonch, Kotli and Mirpur had a Muslim majority culturally aligned to the West Punjab plains. Ladakh, a large mountainous region, had a mostly Buddhist population culturally aligned to Tibet. The northern areas of Gilgit and Baltistan were almost entirely Muslim, with Buddhist minorities, culturally aligned to Pakhtun and Central Asian regions.

Poonch was a jagir bestowed by the Maharaja Ranjit Singh to Gulab Singh's brother Raja Dhian Singh. Upon the latter's death, the jagir was reclaimed by Lahore and it was passed to Gulab Singh in the treaties of Lahore and Amritsar. However, Dhian Singh's son Jawahar Singh put forward a claim to Poonch, and it was granted to him subject to the condition that he was to consult Gulab Singh on `all matters of importance'. He was also expected to present Gulab Singh one horse decked in gold trappings every year. After the death of Raja Jawahar Singh, Hari Singh dispossessed his young son of control over Poonch and set out to integrate it into his State. The move was unpopular in Poonch. The Mahajara's reign imposed a variety of new taxes and the Dogra troops were sent over to enforce collection.

The Sudhan tribes of Poonch and Mirpur were warlike. They comprised the only Muslim troops in the Maharaja Hari Singh's army. During the second world war, over 60,000 of them fought in the British Army. After demobilization, they were forced to go back to farming because the Maharaja refused to accept them into his own army, and they faced the new taxation system of the Maharaja. In the Spring of 1947, they mounted a `no-tax' campaign, inviting severe reprisals from the Maharaja's government. In July, the Maharaja ordered that all Muslims must surrender their arms to the authorities. However, as the Partition violence spread, the same arms were reportedly distributed to the non-Muslims. These tensions led to an uprising in Poonch.

Formation of Azad Kashmir 

At the time of the Partition of India in 1947, the British abandoned their suzerainty over the princely states, which were left with the options of joining India or Pakistan or remaining independent. Hari Singh, the maharaja of Jammu and Kashmir, chose to remain independent, offering to sign standstill agreements with both the dominions.

In the spring of 1947, an uprising against the Maharaja had broken out in Poonch, an area bordering the Rawalpindi division of the West Punjab. Maharaja's administration is said to have started levying punitive taxes on the peasantry which provoked a local revolt and the administration resorted to brutal suppression. The area's population, full of recently demobilized soldiers from the Second World War, rebelled against the Maharaja's forces and gained control of almost the entire district. Large scale massacres and expulsion of Hindus and Sikhs occurred in Mirpur, bhimber, muzzafarabad, kotli, Poonch etc. By 1951, only 750 non- Muslims were alive out of previous population of 1,14,000 in 1941 Census. Today they're none. Following this victory, the pro-Pakistan chieftains of the western Jammu districts of Muzaffarabad, Poonch and Mirpur proclaimed a provisional Azad Jammu and Kashmir government in Pallandri on 24 October 1947.

On 21 October, several thousand Pashtun tribesmen from the North-West Frontier Province poured into Jammu and Kashmir in order to liberate it from the Maharaja's rule. They were led by experienced military leaders and were equipped with modern arms. The Maharaja's crumbling forces were unable to withstand the onslaught. The raiders captured the towns of Muzaffarabad and Baramulla, the latter just twenty miles northwest of the State's capital Srinagar. On 24 October, the Maharaja requested the military assistance of India, which responded that it was unable to help him unless he acceded to India. Accordingly, on 26 October 1947, Maharaja Hari Singh signed an Instrument of Accession, handing over control of defense, external affairs and communications to the Government of India. Indian troops were immediately airlifted into Srinagar. Pakistan intervened subsequently. Fighting ensued between the Indian and Pakistani armies, with the two areas of control stabilized, more or less, around what is now known as the "Line of Control".

Later, India approached the United Nations, asking it to solve the dispute, and resolutions were passed in favor of the holding of a plebiscite with regard to Kashmir's future. However, no such plebiscite has ever been held on either side, since there was a precondition which required the withdrawal of the Pakistani Army along with the non-state elements and the subsequent partial withdrawal of the Indian Army.  from the parts of Kashmir under their respective control – a withdrawal that never took place. In 1949, a cease-fire line separating the Indian- and Pakistani-controlled parts of Kashmir was formally put into effect.

Following the 1949 cease-fire agreement, the government of Pakistan divided the northern and western parts of Kashmir, which it held, into the following two separately-controlled political entities; together, both these territories form the Pakistan administered Kashmir region:
 Gilgit–Baltistan, formerly called the Federally Administered Northern Areas (FANA) – is the much larger area to the north of AJK, ; it was directly administered by Pakistan as a de facto dependent territory, i.e., a non-self-governing territory. However it was officially granted full autonomy on August 29, 2009.

1949 to Present 
In 1955, the Poonch uprising broke out. It was largely concentrated in areas of Rawalakot as well as the rest of Poonch Division. It ended in 1956.

An area of Kashmir that was once under Pakistani control is the Shaksgam tract—a small region along the northeastern border of the Northern Areas that was provisionally ceded by Pakistan to the People's Republic of China in 1963 and which now forms part of China's Uygur Autonomous Region of Xinjiang. The part of Kashmir administered by India currently is divided between Jammu and Kashmir and Ladakh.

In 1972, the then-current border between Pakistan and India, which held areas of Kashmir, was designated as the "Line of Control". The Line of Control has remained unchanged since the 1972 Simla Agreement, which bound the two countries "to settle their differences by peaceful means through bilateral negotiations." Some claim that, in view of that pact, the only solution to the issue is mutual negotiation between the two countries without involving a third party, such as the United Nations.

A devastating earthquake hit Azad Kashmir in 2005.

United Nations intervention 
Jawaharlal Nehru, then Prime Minister of India asked the UN to intervene. The United Nations passed the United Nations Security Council Resolution 47 and later United Nations Security Council Resolution 80, which asked both Pakistan and India to withdraw all its forces from Kashmir simultaneously. This was to be followed by a plebiscite to determine the wishes of people of the entire state of Kashmir.  However, the required withdrawal never happened. The area which remained under the control of Pakistan is called Azad Kashmir. India took over two-thirds of Kashmir without withdrawing their forces. Pakistan citing India did not withdraw their forces also did not withdraw its forces from Kashmir and controls one third of Kashmir.

Constitutional status 
Elections were held to the 49-seat Legislative Assembly of Azad Kashmir on July 11 to the eighth Legislative Assembly since 1970 (seventh since 1974 when Pakistan granted the region a parliamentary system with adult franchise). Azad Kashmir is categorised as an autonomous region, but critics claim titles such as Prime Minister and President for the region's elected political leadership are misleading as candidates are required to sign an affidavit of allegiance to Kashmir's accession to Pakistan.

On September 14, 1994, the Supreme Court of Azad Kashmir ruled that "the Northern areas are a part of J&K State but are not a part of Azad J&K as defined in the Interim Constitution Act 1974". The Northern Areas presently has no officially named status in Pakistan. Pakistan does not consider this area as a "province" of Pakistan or as a part of "Azad Kashmir". They are ruled directly from Islamabad through a Northern Areas Council. A chief executive (usually a retired Pakistani army officer), appointed by Islamabad is the local administrative head. This area presently has no representatives in both the Azad Kashmir Assembly and in Pakistan's parliament. Northern Areas’ Legislative Council was created with a membership of 29 (later increased to 32), but its powers are restricted. On May 11, 2007, the NA's chief executive, who also happens to be the Minister for Kashmir Affairs and Northern Areas Affairs, declared that the region had a right to be represented in the National Assembly. Others demand that it should be given the status of a province. The changes made in 1994 in the local bodies’ ordinance gave more representation to women and delegated some administrative and financial powers to the local administration. However, the people of the region do not enjoy fundamental rights, because it continues to be governed by the Legal Framework Order of 1994.

Azad Kashmir Day
Azad Kashmir Day celebrates the 1st day of the Azad Jammu Kashmir government, created on 24 October 1947.

See also
 History of Gilgit-Baltistan
 History of Kashmir

Kashmir  Region
 Leh
 Siachen Glacier
 Skardu

Conflict related
 Indo-Pakistani wars and conflicts
 Kashmir conflict
 Line of Actual Control (LAC) – dividing Indian and Chinese administered territories
 Pakistan and state-sponsored terrorism
 Sino-Indian War

References

 Sources

Further reading